Kur or Kür is the surname of the following people:
Bob Kur (born 1948), American television journalist
Camilla Kur Larsen (born 1989), Danish association football player
İsmet Kür (1916–2013), Turkish educator, journalist, columnist and writer
Pınar Kür (born 1943), Turkish author and dramatist
Stanisław Kur (born 1929), Polish biblical scholar and Roman Catholic priest